A list of films produced by the Tollywood (Bengali language film industry) based in Kolkata in the year 1992.

A-Z of films

References

External links
 Tollywood films of 1992 at the Internet Movie Database

1992
Bengali
 Bengali
1992 in Indian cinema